The Flanders Heritage Agency is a cultural heritage agency sponsored by the Flemish Government. The organisation is split into four subdivisions; the former VIOE, which inventories  Beschermd erfgoed in the Flemish Region; the agency "Ruimte en Erfgoed" which executes policy on heritage management and protection; the Ministry department of Town and County Planning, Housing Policy and Immovable Heritage, or Ruimtelijke Ordening, Woonbeleid en Onroerend Erfgoed (RWO), which supports the Minister of Culture on policy decisions; and Inspectie RWO, which is the inspection arm of the RWO.

History 
The most tangible product that the agency creates are its inventories in three domains; archeological sites, landscapes, and historical building structures. In 1965 Belgium's inventory of the country's heritage was compared to that of other European countries and was found to be lagging far behind. The then Ministry of Education and Culture decided to address the problem by taking a modern inventory of the architectural heritage and Minister of Culture Renaat Van Elslande took the initiative by selecting a pilot project in the district of Leuven (now in Flemish Brabant). In 1967, the survey was completed and under the new Minister of Culture , this inventory was published in Dutch and French in 1971. All inventoried heritage was described with text and wherever possible it was illustrated with photographs. The last bilingual publication of the project appeared in 1973 with the district of Nivelles (now in Walloon Brabant). Flanders and Wallonia then went their separate ways.

In Flanders, the ongoing inventory was published as a series by location and was printed as Bouwen door de Eeuwen Heen in Vlaanderen, or "Building through the Ages in Flanders". The printed series ran until 2001, and after that the local inventories for each municipality were published as electronic PDF-files.

VIOE
The Vlaams Instituut voor het Onroerend Erfgoed (VIOE) was founded in 2004 and was tasked with finishing the inventory. From 2005 onwards, the inventories were kept in a database called "Inventaris van het Bouwkundig Erfgoed" (IBE), or "Inventory of Architectural Heritage". On 1 juli 2011 the VIOE merged with the Agentschap Onroerend Erfgoed to form a new agency for Immovable Heritage called Onroerend Erfgoed.

Research
The main task of the heritage agency is to conduct the necessary research to fulfill its goals, while making this information sustainably available to all interested parties, including the general public.

In practise, the VIOE conducts architectural heritage research on specific buildings and landscapes, archaeological sites, and ship wrecks.

Finished inventory
In 2009, after more than 40 years of continuous work, the inventory of architectural heritage was published on 25 September in the Belgian Official Journal. The heritage mentioned in this list enjoys some form of sustainability for the future because a number of special measures are in force to actively protect these buildings. This inventory is of course never really "finished", and is in fact reestablished each year in the month of September with updates to existing or new heritage decrees. In addition to the entire buildings that usually fall under architectural heritage, the agency now provides even smaller items in the inventory, such as specific towers, organ s, gates, and walls, but also less obvious objects such as guard stones, gardens, parks (including old trees) and industrial heritage items such as mine elevators, drawbridge machines, and other equipment.

Other heritage organizations in Flanders
For setting protection of movable and immovable heritage, the government agency of Culture, Youth, Sport en Media "Kunsten en Erfgoed" (Arts and Heritage) is the policy executor of the Flemish Government. Inspections at the local level are conducted by the "".

References

External links
 
 
 Erfgoedhuis Den Wolsack on website "Monumentenwacht" in Antwerp
  Belgium profile on the Heritage Portal

Heritage registers in Belgium
Cultural history of Belgium
Protected heritage sites in Belgium
Flemish government departments and agencies
Heritage organizations in Belgium